John Clegge was an  Anglican priest in the first half of the 17th century.

Clegge was educated at the University of Oxford. He held livings at Llangibby and Llansoy from 1601 to 1607. He became Archdeacon of Llandaff in 1646.

References

Archdeacons of Llandaff
17th-century Welsh Anglican priests
Alumni of the University of Oxford